Friedrich Jürgen Carl Brömel Berendsen (March 15, 1904 – October 1, 1974) was a German politician of the Christian Democratic Union (CDU) and former member of the German Bundestag.

Life 
He was a member of the German Bundestag from 1953 until his resignation on 15 September 1959. After his retirement he was again a member of the Bundestag from 1965 to 1969.

Literature

References

1904 births
1974 deaths
Members of the Bundestag for Baden-Württemberg
Members of the Bundestag for North Rhine-Westphalia
Members of the Bundestag 1965–1969
Members of the Bundestag 1957–1961
Members of the Bundestag 1953–1957
Members of the Bundestag for the Christian Democratic Union of Germany